The Aviation Security Act 1982 is an Act of Parliament of the United Kingdom Parliament which covers offences against the safety of aircraft; protection of aircraft, aerodromes, and air navigation installations against acts of violence; policing of airports; and funding.

In addition to murder and conspiracy, the defendants, at the Pan Am Flight 103 bombing trial, were accused of breaches of the 1982 Act.

See also
List of Acts of Parliament of the United Kingdom Parliament, 1980-1999

References

External links

United Kingdom public law
United Kingdom Acts of Parliament 1982
Aviation law
Aviation in the United Kingdom
1982 in aviation